Scirpophaga goliath is a moth in the family Crambidae. It was described by Hubert Marion and Pierre Viette in 1953. It is found on Madagascar.

The wingspan is 46–52 mm.

References

Moths described in 1953
Schoenobiinae
Moths of Madagascar